Mixed pickles are pickles made from a variety of vegetables mixed in the same pickling process. Mixed pickles are eaten much like other pickles: in small amounts to add flavor and to accent a meal. Mixed pickles appear in many different world cuisines. 

In U.S. cuisine, a mixed pickle consists of vegetables typically including cucumbers, cauliflower, cut large onions, and bell peppers, as well as spices like garlic, dill, allspice, and chili peppers, suspended in vinegar. Mixed pickles may also be categorized as sweet or sour depending on the addition of a sweetening agent like sugar.

In British cuisine, mixed pickles typically include small whole onions, gherkins, and cauliflower. Some specific kinds of British mixed pickle are Branston pickle (more properly termed a relish), and piccalilli (the latter also found in U.S. cuisine).

In Indian cuisine, a mixed Indian pickle is more likely to contain fruits (for example, mangos and limes) as well as vegetables. Indian pickle is prepared using oil unlike western pickles, and is more likely to use lemon juice or some other acid as a souring agent instead of vinegar. Spices and ingredients vary from region to region.

Recipes for mixed pickles can also be found in Chinese cuisine, Middle Eastern cuisine, and many other world cuisines.

See also

References

External links
Photos of Western mixed pickles  (second to last and third to last photos)

Pickles
Indian pickles
Vegetable dishes